Safayyeh District is in Khoy County, West Azerbaijan province, Iran. At the 2006 National Census, its population was 20,172 in 3,798 households. The following census in 2011 counted 21,558 people in 5,042 households. At the latest census in 2016, the district had 19,543 inhabitants in 4,893 households.

References 

Khoy County

Districts of West Azerbaijan Province

Populated places in West Azerbaijan Province

Populated places in Khoy County